Yves Bonsang (19 May 1950 – 13 January 2000) was a French bobsledder. He competed in the four man event at the 1972 Winter Olympics.

References

1950 births
2000 deaths
French male bobsledders
Olympic bobsledders of France
Bobsledders at the 1972 Winter Olympics
Place of birth missing